Clivina parvula is a species of ground beetle in the subfamily Scaritinae. It was described by Putzeys in 1866.

References

parvula
Beetles described in 1866